Jonathan William "Joe" Bramley (born 1983) is a New Zealand musician.

Born in Hong Kong to parents Geoff Bramley and Janet Brice, Bramley has two siblings: older brother Nick Bramley and younger brother Richie Bramley. He has lived in Wellington (where he attended Scots College) and in Auckland (where he attended Auckland Grammar School), as well as in Melbourne, Australia (with the band Betchadupa).  he lives in London.

External links

 Official Fan Forum

1983 births
People educated at Auckland Grammar School
People educated at Scots College, Wellington
Living people
New Zealand bass guitarists
Male bass guitarists
21st-century bass guitarists
21st-century male musicians
New Zealand male guitarists
New Zealand guitarists